Moussa Touré (born 1958), is a Sénégalese filmmaker. He is best known as the director of critically acclaimed films Toubab Bi, TGV and La Pirogue. Apart from direction, he is also a technician, writer, producer and actor.

Personal life
Touré was born in 1958 in Dakar, Senegal.

Career
He started cinema career as technician. Then in 1987, he turned to direction with a short film and founded his own production firm called 'Les Films du Crocodile'. In 1991, Touré made his maiden feature film Toubab Bi. The film received critical acclaim and awarded at several international film festivals including 'Un Certain Regard section' of Cannes Film Festival. After the success of first feature, he made his second film TGV in 1998 with the support by Makéna Diop. Later in 1999, the film won the Audience Award at the 9th Africa International Film Festival. 

In 1996, he made a supporting role in the film Les Caprices d'un rivière directed by Bernard Giraudeau. In 2005, he made a documentary 5x5 which gained critical reception. In 2011, Touré was appointed as the Head of the Jury panel in 2011 Panafrican Film and Television Festival of Ouagadougou (FESPACO). Then in 2012, he directed his third feature film La Pirogue, particularly a semi-documentary movie. The film was filmed and edited with the efficiency of a Hollywood blockbuster.

In 2020, he directed the film Red Dust which is produced by Luxembourgish outfit a BAHN and Dakar-based Touré's production house 'Les Films du Crocodile'. The film will be released in 2022.

Filmography

References

External links
 

1985 births
Living people
Senegalese Muslims
Senegalese film directors
Senegalese film producers